Fuso or Fusō may refer to:

 Fusō is the Japanese pronunciation of the word Fusang (扶桑), an ancient naming for Japan.
 , an ironclad warship of the Imperial Japanese Navy that fought in the Battle of Yalu River
 , lead ship of the Fusō class
 , a class of two battleships of the Imperial Japanese Navy that fought in World War II
 Mitsubishi Fuso Truck and Bus Corporation (MFTBC), or one of the company's brands of truck
 Mitsubishi Fuso Truck of America, Inc., a subsidiary of MFTBC
 Fusō, Aichi, a town in Japan
 A line of semi-custom bicycle frames made by Dave Moulton
 The real-world counterpart of Japan in the Strike Witches franchise, one of few countries spared from the Neuroi assault